The shank is the end of a drill bit grasped by the chuck of a drill. The cutting edges of the drill bit contact the workpiece, and are connected via the shaft with the shank, which fits into the chuck. In many cases a general-purpose arrangement is used, such as a bit with cylindrical shaft and shank in a three-jaw chuck which grips a cylindrical shank tightly.  Different shank and chuck combination can deliver improved performance, such as allowing higher torque, greater centering accuracy, or moving the bit independently of the chuck, with a hammer action.

Brace shank

This shank was common before 1850, and is still in production. At first, the tapered shank was just rammed into a square hole in the end of the drill. Over time, various chuck designs have been invented, and modern chucks can grasp and drive this shank effectively.

It has been difficult to find a reference to the included angle of the taper, but 7 different bits were measured, and they all had an included angle of 8 ± 0.25 degrees.

 Easy to make in a forge
 Very wide tolerances allowable (not very precise)
 Moderate torque transmission but without the slipping possible with round shanks
 Appropriate chuck required

Straight shank

The straight shank is the most usual style on modern drill bits, by number manufactured. The whole of the drill bit, shaft and shank, is usually of the same diameter. It is held usually in a three-jaw drill chuck. Bits of diameter too small to grip firmly can have straight shanks of larger diameter than the drill, which can be held firmly in a standard size collet or chuck. Large drill bits can have straight shanks narrower than the drill diameter so that they can be fitted in chucks not able to chuck the full diameter. Such a drill bit is called a reduced-shank or blacksmith's drill. For example, this allows a  bit to be used in a pistol-grip drill's  chuck. This allows drill presses with  chucks to run the larger drills. The name comes from a company in Salem, Ohio that broke up into other companies circa 1890; bits of this design were popularized by that company.

 Easy to centerless grind or turn on a lathe
 Minimum of turning or grinding needed if the drill bit is made from appropriately sized round bar stock
 Can be held in a standard drill chuck, which must be tightened—only friction prevents slipping
 Can also be held in a collet chuck (which must be tightened), particularly for smaller sizes
 Very accurate centering
 Torque transmission limited by slipping of cylindrical shank

Hex shank

The flats of a hex shank can either be machined on a round shank, as in the photograph, or be the natural flats of hex bar stock. A hex shank can be grasped by a 3-jaw drill chuck or held in a chuck specifically for hex shanks. Quarter-inch hex shanks are common for machine screwdriver bits and have spread from that application to be used for drill bits that are compatible with screwdriver machinery.
 Zero manufacturing if the drill bit is made from hex bar stock
 Can be held in a drill chuck made for cylindrical shanks
 Can be held in a hex screwdriver bit chuck
 High torque transmission, limited only by strength
 No need to tighten, shape does not allow slipping
 Moderately accurate centering
 Cannot be held in a regular round collet
 A special 3c or 5c HEX collet must be used.

SDS shank

The diameter of a SDS Plus shank is 10 millimeters. The SDS Max is larger with an 18 mm shank diameter, while the SDS Quick has a smaller 6 mm shank diameter.

The SDS shank is simply pushed into the spring-loaded chuck without tightening. SDS shank and chucks are made to be used for hammer drilling with masonry drills in stone and concrete. The drill bit is not held solidly in the chuck, but can slide back and forth like a piston; it does not slip during rotation due to the non-circular shank cross-section, matching the chuck. The hammer of the drill acts to accelerate only the drill bit itself, and not the large mass of the chuck, which makes hammer drilling with an SDS shank drill bit more productive.

Rotational drive uses the sliding keyways that open to the end of the shank, which mate with keys in the chuck. The smaller indentations that do not open to the end are grasped by the chuck to prevent the drill bit falling out. The hammer of the drill hits the flat end of the shank. The shank must be lubricated with grease to reduce the friction of the sliding action in the chuck.

There are four standard sizes of SDS: SDS Quick, SDS-plus (or SDSplus or SDS+), SDS-Top and SDS-max. SDS-plus is the most common by count of tools manufactured, with masonry drills from 4 mm diameter to 30 mm (and from 5/32" to 1-1/4") diameter ordinarily available. The shortest SDS-plus masonry drill bits are about 110 mm overall length, and the longest 1500 mm. SDS-max is more common for larger rotary hammers and chipping guns, and common sizes start at  diameter up to  diameter. SDS-Top with 14 mm diameter has been largely phased out in North America and is not common except for older tools. Hilti's TE-S system is similar to these SDS systems, but is designed for chipping only (no rotation) in tools for applications larger than could be handled by SDS-Max (e.g. demolition of concrete walls or floors).

The SDS bit was developed by Bosch in 1975 improving on the TE system introduced by Hilti in 1960. 
Hilti's original 10 mm TE-D and 18 mm TE-F shanks can be used in SDS-plus and SDS-max chucks respectively but not vice versa while the newer TE-C, TE-T and TE-Y are fully compatible.

In German-speaking countries the back-formation  ("Clamping System") is used, though Bosch uses "Special Direct System" for international purposes.

 Relatively complex to manufacture although Chinese made SDS tools and machines have become very affordable since the patents expired
 Better hammer drilling performance than rigidly gripped bits
 Drills with a "rotation-stop" mode can use chiselling bits
 One-handed quick chucking operation
 Can only be held in an SDS chuck
 Not very accurate centering
 High torque transmission

Triangle shank

The triangle shank is almost always made by machining three flats on round bar stock. It is intended as a minor modification of a straight shank, still allowing it to be held in a 3-jaw drill chuck, but allowing higher torque transmission and limited slipping.
 Can be held in a drill chuck
 High torque transmission
 Moderately accurate centering
 Cannot be held in a collet

Morse taper shank

The Morse taper twist drill bits pictured right are used in metalworking. The full range of tapers is from 0 to 7.

The Morse taper allows the bit to be mounted directly into the spindle of a drill, lathe tailstock, or (with the use of adapters) into the spindle of milling machines. It is a self-locking (or self holding) taper of approximately 5/8" per foot that allows the torque to be transferred to the drill bit by the friction between the taper shank and the socket. The tang at the end of the taper provides a positive drive of the drill when the taper fails to grip. Many believe that the tang is there for the purpose of ejecting the tool from the taper but as not all tools have a tang (e.g. a centre lathe centre) these can still be ejected despite not having the tang.

The arbor of a drill chuck is often a Morse taper and this allows the chuck assembly to be removed and directly replaced with the shank of a Morse taper drill bit. A range of sleeves may be used to bring the size of the smaller Morse tapers up to the size of the drive spindle's larger taper. Sockets are also available to extend the effective length of the drill as well as offering a variety of taper combinations.

The detail image shows a Morse taper shank on a 16 mm diameter drill bit.

 Simple to manufacture on a lathe
 Cannot be held in a chuck or collet
 High torque transmission provided the bit is driven hard into the workpiece
 Very accurate centering

Square shank
Square taper drills were also used for large ratchet drills, for drilling large holes, or in thick plate.  These bits would fit straight into a ratchet drill, and the ratchet drill would be used against a strong arm, for pressure to push the drill into the work piece.

Threaded shank
Some drills, wire wheels, etc. use a threaded shank. One example is cylindrical wire wheels meant to be pushed into a pipe of some sort to clean the inside of the pipe, but some ordinary, but mostly rather large, wood drills have threaded shanks as well.

Small (about  diameter) threaded drill bits and countersinks are common in aircraft metal work.  Threaded drill bits may be held in drills meant to reach into very tight spaces, and threaded countersink cutters are widely used (along with finely adjustable depth stops) to create holes which put a matching rivet directly flush with the surface.

References

Hole making